Winfield (Wood Lake) Water Aerodrome  is located  north of Winfield, British Columbia, Canada.

See also
 List of airports in the Okanagan

References

Seaplane bases in British Columbia
Regional District of Central Okanagan
Airports in the Okanagan
Registered aerodromes in British Columbia